À bientôt, j'espère (literally translates as Until soon, I hope) is a 1968 French documentary film directed by Chris Marker and Mario Marret. It tells the story of a strike action at the Rhodiaceta textile factory in Besançon in March 1967. The film was shot in black and white, with photography by Pierre Lhomme.

External links 
 

1968 films
Films directed by Chris Marker
French documentary films
1960s French-language films
1968 documentary films
Black-and-white documentary films
Documentary films about the labor movement
1960s French films